The 2004 No Way Out was the sixth No Way Out professional wrestling pay-per-view (PPV) event produced by World Wrestling Entertainment (WWE). It was held exclusively for wrestlers from the promotion's SmackDown! brand division. The event took place on February 15, 2004, at the Cow Palace in Daly City, California. The event is best remembered for its final match, which saw Eddie Guerrero defeat WWE Champion Brock Lesnar to win the title, his top wrestling achievement before his death in 2005.

No Way Out grossed over US$450,000 ticket sales from an attendance of approximately 11,000 and received 350,000 pay-per-view buys, and was instrumental in helping WWE increase its pay-per-view revenue by $11.9 million compared to the previous year. Like the event, the DVD received favorable reviews.

Production

Background
No Way Out was first held by World Wrestling Entertainment (WWE) as the 20th In Your House pay-per-view (PPV) in February 1998. Following the discontinuation of the In Your House series, No Way Out returned in February 2000 as its own PPV event, thus establishing it as the annual February PPV for the promotion. The 2004 event was the sixth event in the No Way Out chronology and was held on February 15 at the Cow Palace in Daly City, California. While the previous year's event featured wrestlers from both the Raw and SmackDown! brands, the 2004 event featured wrestlers exclusively from the SmackDown! brand, which made it the first brand-exclusive No Way Out event.

Storylines

The event consisted of eight professional wrestling matches with wrestlers involved in pre-existing scripted feuds, and storylines. Wrestlers were portrayed as either villains or fan favorites as they followed a series of tension-building events, which culminated in a wrestling match or series of matches. All wrestlers belonged to the SmackDown! brand – a storyline division in which WWE assigned its employees to a different program.

After winning a 15-man Royal Rumble match on the January 29 episode of SmackDown!, Eddie Guerrero earned the right to challenge for the WWE Championship at No Way Out against the champion Brock Lesnar in a singles match. Outside the storyline with Guerrero, Lesnar was involved in a staged rivalry with Goldberg, a member of the Raw brand. The feud between Lesnar and Goldberg began at the Royal Rumble. Lesnar interfered in the Royal Rumble match attacking Goldberg, which caused Goldberg to be eliminated from the match. On January 26 and January 29 Goldberg and Lesnar conducted promos on respective episodes of Raw and SmackDown!, in which they insulted each other. On the February 2 episode of Raw, Sheriff Steve Austin gave Goldberg the option of attending No Way Out by giving him a front-row ticket. On the February 5 episode of SmackDown!, the storyline between Guerrero and Lesnar was enhanced when they began a brawl after an in-ring interview segment.

On the February 5 episode of SmackDown!, General manager Paul Heyman scheduled a triple threat match between Big Show, Kurt Angle and John Cena for No Way Out. The winner of that match would face the WWE Champion at WrestleMania XX for the title. The rivalry continued to develop on the February 12 episode of SmackDown!, when Angle was scheduled to team with Guerrero to face Big Show and Lesnar, but was found unconscious backstage. Cena then replaced Angle in the match and defeated Big Show and Lesnar with Guerrero.

In February, WWE Cruiserweight Champion Rey Mysterio produced "Crossing Borders", which was No Way Out's official theme song. In this storyline, Chavo Guerrero became jealous of the attention Mysterio garnered as a result of recording the song. Therefore, Heyman promoted a match between the two at No Way Out for the Cruiserweight Championship during the February 5 episode of SmackDown!. On the February 12 episode of SmackDown!, Mysterio was accompanied by Jorge Páez, a professional boxer and childhood friend of Mysterio who appeared in his "Crossing Borders" music video, to his match against Tajiri. Mysterio defeated Tajiri but was attacked by Guerrero and Chavo Guerrero, Sr. after the match until Paez intervened and helped Mysterio.

Event

Sunday Night Heat
Before the event began and aired live on pay-per-view, Tajiri, Sakoda and Akio defeated Último Dragón, Billy Kidman, and Paul London in a 6-Man Tag Team Match on Sunday Night Heat.

 Main Show 

After Sunday Night Heat, the pay-per-view began with a handicap match that saw the WWE Tag Team Champions Rikishi and Scotty 2 Hotty defend their titles against Basham Brothers (Doug Basham and Danny Basham) and Shaniqua. During the match Hotty attempted a worm on Shaniqua, but Shaniqua countered by clotheslining Hotty. The challengers had the advantage until Hotty clotheslined the Bashams, causing them to flip over the top ring rope and into ringside. Afterwards, Rikishi delivered a Samoan drop. Rikishi then covered Shaniqua to retain the championships.

Next was a singles match, in which Jamie Noble was blindfolded as he faced his storyline girlfriend Nidia. Nidia would take advantage of Noble's inability to see by performing antics that caused him to fall. Eventually, Noble was able to apply the guillotine choke on Nidia. Noble won the match after he forced her to submit with this move.

The third contest was a tag team match, in which World's Greatest Tag Team (Shelton Benjamin and Charlie Haas) faced the APA (Bradshaw and Faarooq). At one point, Bradshaw performed a clothesline on Haas. Benjamin then delivered a superkick to Bradshaw and pinned him to gain the win for his team. After the match, Goldberg was seen arriving at the arena and being escorted to his seat by arena security. In the ring, SmackDown! General Manager Paul Heyman gave a promotional in-ring segment on how SmackDown! was the better program over Raw. Brock Lesnar would come down to the ring to promote his match and to insult Goldberg. As part of the storyline, Goldberg immediately jumped over the barricade into the ring, where Lesnar performed a spear on Goldberg. However, he recuperated and delivered a Jackhammer to Lesnar. Goldberg was then escorted out of the arena by security.

This altercation was followed by a match between Hardcore Holly and Rhyno. Before the match began, Holly and Rhyno brawled on the entrance ramp, before they entered the ring. Once there, Holly executed a superplex, though, as they recuperated, Rhyno delivered a Gore that caused Holly to roll out of the ring. Afterwards, Holly delivered an Alabama slam for the pinfall.

In the fifth match Rey Mysterio (managed by Jorge Páez), defended his WWE Cruiserweight Championship against Chavo Guerrero (managed by his father Chavo Guerrero, Sr.) During the fight, Mysterio performed a 619 on Guerrero, leading to an attack by Paez on Guerrero, Sr. The referee ordered Paez backstage. Both fighters wrestled inconclusively until Mysterio delivered a second 619. During the second sequence of the move, Guerrero grabbed Mysterio's legs and achieved a position with his shoulders spread so as to win both a pinfall and the WWE Cruiserweight title.

The following match was the triple threat match between Big Show, John Cena and Kurt Angle, with the winner facing the WWE Champion at WrestleMania XX. Thereafter, Cena delivered an FU, while Angle threw Big Show out of the ring with an Angle Slam. Angle then applied an ankle lock on Cena, forcing him to submit. As a result, Angle won a WWE Championship match at WrestleMania XX.

The main event featured Brock Lesnar defending the WWE Championship against Eddie Guerrero. Lesnar used his size advantage over Guerrero throughout the match. As Lesnar attempted an F-5, he knocked down the referee. Lesnar then attempted to take advantage of the referee's state, as he went to retrieve the WWE title belt to hit Guerrero. Meanwhile, Goldberg came down into the ring and delivered a spear to Lesnar. As Goldberg retreated, Guerrero countered Lesnar's second F5 into a DDT on the title belt while the referee regained consciousness. Guerrero kicked the belt out of the ring to prevent the referee from seeing it and performed his Frog splash to pin Lesnar and win the WWE Championship from him.

 Reception 
The Cow Palace arena usually can accommodate 13,000, but the capacity was reduced to 11,000 for No Way Out 2004. This event grossed over $450,000 from an approximate attendance of 11,000 which was the maximum allowed. It also received 350,000 pay-per-view buys. No Way Out helped World Wrestling Entertainment earn $43.7 million in revenue from pay-per-view events versus $31.8 million the previous year; Linda McMahon, then CEO of WWE, confirmed this statement on June 21, 2004, in a quarterly financial report. The event received mostly positive reviews. Canadian Online Explorer's professional wrestling section described the event as "Smackdown!  us our money's worth last night but they also set up what's probably going to be the best match at Wrestlemania." Kevin Sowers from PWTorch described the main event between Eddie Guerrero and Brock Lesnar as "one to remember for a long time." The event was released on DVD on March 16, 2004. After its release, the DVD received a rating of 8.5 out of 10 points by IGN.

 Aftermath 
At WrestleMania XX, Eddie Guerrero defeated Kurt Angle via pinfall and retained the WWE Championship. John "Bradshaw" Layfield (JBL), portraying a new character after the semi-retirement of his tag team partner Faarooq, challenged Guerrero for the WWE Championship and defeated him at The Great American Bash to win the title. Guerrero failed to recapture the title from JBL in a steel cage match on the July 15 episode of SmackDown!. After Guerrero's death in November 2005, WWE held tribute shows on Raw and SmackDown! During these programs, No Way Out was the main highlight of Guerrero's career, as it was where he won his only world championship. John Cena began a rivalry with Big Show over his WWE United States Championship and, at WrestleMania, Cena defeated Big Show to win the title. Goldberg and Lesnar continued their rivalry, leading to a match promoted at WrestleMania, in which Goldberg defeated Lesnar. After their match, Goldberg and Lesnar left the company, although Lesnar would make his return in April 2012 and Goldberg made his return in October 2016.

Rey Mysterio and Chavo Guerrero's storyline over the WWE Cruiserweight Championship also continued, culminating in a battle royal match at WrestleMania XX involving other wrestlers. Guerrero last eliminated Mysterio to retain his title in this match. After the Draft Lottery, a mock sports draft lottery in which wrestlers switched programs, Rico was drafted to SmackDown!, while Shelton Benjamin was drafted to Raw, in the process splitting up The World's Greatest Tag Team. Afterward, Charlie Haas and Rico won the WWE Tag Team Championship from Rikishi and Scotty 2 Hotty on the April 22 episode of SmackDown!''.

Results

References

External links 
 Official No Way Out 2004 Website

2004 in California
2004 WWE pay-per-view events
Events in California
February 2004 events in the United States
Professional wrestling in California
2004
WWE SmackDown

es:WWE No Way Out#2004